Andrzej Przeździecki (28 November 1926 – 6 January 2011) was a Polish fencer. He competed in the individual and team épée events at the 1952 Summer Olympics.

References

1926 births
2011 deaths
Polish male fencers
Olympic fencers of Poland
Fencers at the 1952 Summer Olympics
Fencers from Warsaw